Stu Nahan (June 23, 1926 – December 26, 2007) was an American sportscaster best known for his television broadcasting career in Los Angeles from the 1950s through the 1990s. He is also remembered for his role as a boxing commentator in the first six Rocky films. He received a star on the Hollywood Walk of Fame at 6549 Hollywood Boulevard on May 25, 2007.

Biography

Early life and career
A native of Los Angeles, Nahan moved at age 2 with his mother to Canada, where he grew up playing ice hockey.

A star goalie at McGill University in Montreal, he signed a contract with the Toronto Maple Leafs of the National Hockey League in 1946. He was assigned to the minor-league Los Angeles Monarchs, who through the early 1950s played at the Pan Pacific Auditorium.

Nahan originally began working on a children's television program, appearing as "Skipper Stu" in Sacramento in the 1950s. He worked for KCRA in Sacramento as a sportscaster. Nahan later moved to Haddonfield, New Jersey (near Philadelphia) where he hosted his own children's show as Captain Philadelphia, dressed in an astronaut outfit, on the now defunct WKBS-TV. During this stint, Nahan also provided the play-by-play commentary for the NHL's Philadelphia Flyers at WTAF, working alongside Gene Hart, and teamed with Tom Brookshier to call Philadelphia Eagles NFL games for CBS.

Film career
In the mid-to-late 1970s, Nahan began working in the movie industry. He always played a sports commentator, usually appearing as himself. Aside from the Rocky series, Nahan is also remembered for a brief appearance in Fast Times at Ridgemont High (1982), in which he interviews the character Jeff Spicoli (Sean Penn) in a dream sequence; this scene was parodied in "Chuck Versus Tom Sawyer" with a fictional "Stu Brewster" (portrayed by Bill Lewis). Nahan also had a bit part in the 1971 TV movie, Brian's Song, as the speaker who introduced Gale Sayers at the awards banquet where Sayers was named Rookie of the Year.  He played a small but vital role in the Rocky films as the play-by-play commentator who called all of the fictional boxer's title bouts. Nahan's voice was used for the play-by-play in the computer boxing game that helped spark the title character's comeback in the sixth film of the series, Rocky Balboa. Additionally, he had a small role as an announcer in The A-Team episode, "Quarterback Sneak". Mr. Nahan also had a small role as the news anchor in the 1979 movie Meteor. Mr. Nahan also had a small part in CHiPs episode "Something Special" S6E6 as himself.

Los Angeles television market
Nahan was a sports anchor in the Los Angeles television market for roughly 30 years, with KABC-TV (1968–1977), KNBC (1977–1986) and KTLA (1988–1999). He also spent time with radio stations KABC, KXTA, and KFWB.  He was involved with the Los Angeles Dodgers' pregame show, from which he retired after the 2004 season.

Death
Nahan had battled lymphoma since being diagnosed in January 2006. He died at his home in Studio City, California, aged 81.

His star on the Hollywood Walk of Fame is at 6549 Hollywood Blvd.

Filmography
Gus (1976) - L.A. Sportscaster
Rocky (1976) - Fight Commentator (uncredited)
Rocky II (1979) - Fight Commentator
Meteor (1979) - Football Announcer
Private Benjamin (1980) - Newscaster
Rocky III (1982) - Title Rematch Commentator
Fast Times at Ridgemont High (1982) - Himself
Rocky IV (1985) - Commentator #1
The A Team (1987) - Commentator #1
Transylvania Twist (1989) - Sports Announcer
Taking Care of Business (1990) - Radio Reporter at Airport
Rocky V (1990) - Fight Commentator
The Great White Hype (1996) - Fight Announcer #1
Rocky Balboa (2006) - Computer Fight Commentator (voice) (final film role)

References

External links
 Philadelphia Broadcast Pioneer with Captain Philadelphia photograph from 1967
 Obituary from Philaldephia Inquirer daily newspaper
 Obituary
 TV.com obit
 CBS2 Obituary
 

1926 births
2007 deaths
20th-century American male actors
American Football League announcers
American male film actors
American radio sports announcers
American television sports announcers
Boxing commentators
Burials at Valley Oaks Memorial Park
Canadian male film actors
College football announcers
Deaths from cancer in California
Deaths from lymphoma
Jewish American male actors
Jewish Canadian journalists
Los Angeles Dodgers announcers
Major League Baseball broadcasters
McGill University alumni
National Football League announcers
National Hockey League broadcasters
People from Studio City, Los Angeles
Philadelphia Eagles announcers
Philadelphia Flyers announcers
San Diego Chargers announcers
St. Louis Blues announcers
Television anchors from Los Angeles
Television anchors from Philadelphia
Television anchors from Sacramento, California